Tomorrow Never Comes is a 1978 British-Canadian crime film directed by Peter Collinson and starring Oliver Reed and Susan George.

Plot
Coming back from an extended business trip, Frank (Stephen McHattie) discovers that his girlfriend Janie (Susan George) is now working at a new resort hotel where the owner has given her a permanent place to stay, as well as other gifts, in exchange for her affections. In the course of fighting over this development, tensions between Frank and Janie escalate out of control until he is holding her hostage in a standoff with the police. As the negotiators (Oliver Reed, Paul Koslo) try to talk Frank into giving himself up, the desperate man feels himself being pushed further and further into a corner.

Cast
Oliver Reed as Jim Wilson
Susan George as Janie
Raymond Burr as Burke
John Ireland as Captain
Stephen McHattie as Frank
Donald Pleasence as Dr. Todd
Paul Koslo as Willy
John Osborne as Robert L. Lyne
Cec Linder as Milton
Richard Donat as Ray
Delores Etienne as Hilda

Production
The film was a "tax shelter co-production" between the UK and Canada. The picture was filmed in the province of Quebec.

Susan George had worked with Peter Collinson before in Up the Junction (1968) and Fright (1971).

Awards
The film was entered into the 11th Moscow International Film Festival.

References

External links

1978 films
Canadian crime drama films
British crime drama films
English-language Canadian films
Films directed by Peter Collinson
Films scored by Roy Budd
1978 crime drama films
1970s English-language films
1970s Canadian films
1970s British films